Korea National Railway is a railroad construction and management company in South Korea formed by the merger of KNR Construction Headquarters and Korean Express Railroad Construction Corporation. Its main clients are Korail. They oversee the construction of all railways in South Korea. Korea National Railway was established by the Korea National Railway Act and is a subsidiary of the Ministry of Land, Infrastructure and Transport.

References

External links
 KNR official website (English)

Railway infrastructure companies
Railway companies of South Korea